Indian Springs School District 109 (ISD 109) is a school district headquartered in Justice, Illinois, in the Chicago metropolitan area. It operates elementary schools and one junior high school.

Schools
 Wilkins Junior High School (Justice)
Elementary schools:
 Bridgeview Elementary School (Bridgeview)
 Brodnicki Elementary School (Justice)
 Lyle Elementary School (Bridgeview)
 Wilkins Elementary School (Justice)
Early childhood:
 Gladness V. Player Early Childhood Center (Justice)

References

External links
 

School districts in Cook County, Illinois